This list of German World War II jet aces has a sortable table of notable German jet ace pilots during World War II.

Background
A flying ace or fighter ace is a military aviator credited with shooting down five or more enemy aircraft during aerial combat (The Germans traditionally set the threshold at 10 victories.). During World War II, hundreds of German Luftwaffe fighter pilots achieved this feat flying contemporary piston engine fighter aircraft. However, only 28 pilots are credited with shooting down five or more enemy aircraft while flying a jet-powered aircraft.

Jet aircraft first engaged in air combat on 26 July 1944, when Leutnant Alfred Schreiber, flying Messerschmitt Me 262 A-1a W.Nr. 130 017 (German language: Werknummer – factory serial  number), attacked an unarmed photo-reconnaissance De Havilland Mosquito PR Mk XVI, of No. 540 Squadron RAF, over the Alps. Some sources refer to this as the first victory in air combat by a pilot of a jet fighter, although the crew of the damaged Mosquito managed to return to an Allied airfield in Italy.

The first confirmed destruction of an enemy aircraft by an Me 262 pilot occurred on 8 August 1944, when Leutnant Joachim Weber shot down  another Mosquito PR XVI from No. 540 Squadron, over Ohlstadt, in Bavaria.

On 15 August 1944, Schreiber took off to intercept a Mosquito PR XVI (NS520) of 60 Squadron, South African Air Force crewed by Captain S. Pienaar and Lieutenant A. Lockhart-Ross, who were tasked with photographing airfields in the Black Forest area. Schreiber caused severe damage in his first attack and made more than 10 passes at the Mosquito before low fuel levels cause him to break off. Pienaar and Lockhart-Ross survived a crash landing at San Severo in Italy; their reconnaissance film and debriefing provided the Allies with valuable intelligence on the Me 262.

During 1944–45, the Luftwaffe committed two other jet- or rocket-powered fighters to combat operations. In addition to the Me 262, the Messerschmitt Me 163 Komet and the Heinkel He 162 Volksjäger both become operational. Few claims were made by pilots of the Me 163 and He 162, and none achieved ace status on either of these types.

German jet aces

The list is initially sorted by the number of jet victories claimed.

Notes

References

Citations

Bibliography

 
 
 
 
 
 
 
 
 
 

Germany jet aces
Fly

Jet aces